is a railway station on the Ainokaze Toyama Railway Line in the city of Takaoka, Toyama Prefecture, Japan, operated by the third-sector railway operator Ainokaze Toyama Railway.

Lines

Station layout 
Nishi-Takaoka Station has two ground-level opposed side platforms connected by a footbridge. The station is attended.

Platforms

History 
Nishi-Takaoka Station opened on 25 April 1957 as a station on the Japanese National Railways (JNR). It was privatized on 1 April 1984, becoming a station on JR West.

From this date, Nishi-Takaoka Station was transferred to the ownership of the third-sector operating company Ainokaze Toyama Railway.

Adjacent stations

Passenger statistics
In fiscal 2015, the station was used by an average of 597 passengers daily (boarding passengers only).

Surrounding area
 Hokuriku Coca-Cola Bottling

See also
 List of railway stations in Japan

References

External links

  

Railway stations in Toyama Prefecture
Takaoka, Toyama
Railway stations in Japan opened in 1957
Ainokaze Toyama Railway Line